Dechen Pem is a Bhutanese singer. She started singing in 1994 and had an album produced through Norling Drayang.

She won numerous awards including the award for Best Playback Singer (Female) at the 8th National Film Awards as well as the award for Best Playback Singer (Female) at the 1st Viewers Choice Awards’ 
Dechen pem is cited as one of the veteran rigser singer in Bhutan. She is currently judging the National Singing Competition, Druk Super Star organized by actor Kencho Wangdi

Personal life
She is married and has two children.
In 1993, she joined the Teacher Training College in Paro and upon graduation became a teacher. However, by 2005 she had returned to singing as well as film making.

Songs
Final Cry (film)
Phu Ru Ru Ru
Zamling Miee Bumo
Perfect Girl (film)
Tendre
Gawai Semten
Norbu My Beloved Yak (film)
Gang Thowai
Olo Lo Lai
Gungsa Yala
Golden Cup (film)
Gangchen
Gesar Shichham

Arunachal Pradesh to Thimphu (film)
So Ya So Ya
Ha Hu..
Tawang Bazer
Tharingsa

Films
Sergyel
Sem Gai Demtse
Sem Hingi Sangtam

Awards
She has won eight awards for best playback singing.

Best female playback singer for Sem Gi Damtse

References

Bhutanese musicians
Living people
Bhutanese actresses
Year of birth missing (living people)